In mathematics, the Fontaine–Mazur conjectures are some conjectures introduced by  about when p-adic representations of Galois groups of number fields can be constructed from representations on étale cohomology groups of a varieties.

References

External links
Robert Coleman's lectures on the Fontaine–Mazur conjecture

Galois theory
Number theory
Conjectures